Hamirpur is a constituency of the Uttar Pradesh Legislative Assembly covering the city of Hamirpur in the Hamirpur district of Uttar Pradesh, India.

Hamirpur is one of five assembly constituencies in the Hamirpur Lok Sabha constituency. Since 2008, this assembly constituency is numbered 228 amongst 403 constituencies.

Members of Legislative Assembly

 *By Election

Dr. Manoj Prajapati (BJP) won in last Assembly election of 2022 Uttar Pradesh Legislative Elections
.

Election results

References

External links
 

Assembly constituencies of Uttar Pradesh
Hamirpur, Uttar Pradesh